Puntius melanostigma is a species of ray-finned fish in the genus Puntius from India.

References 

melanostigma
Taxa named by Francis Day
Fish described in 1878
Barbs (fish)